Tatiana Albertovna  Abramova (born February 5, 1975) is a Russian actress and singer.

Biography 
Tatiana Abramova was born in Tyumen, immediately after birth moved to Nizhnevartovsk. A few years later the family moved to Tyumen Abramovs where Tatiana graduated from music school.
After high school, she came to Moscow for entrance exams, but unexpectedly she came to St. Petersburg, where she remained. In 1992, Tatiana took part in the pop contest  Morning Star  and in 1995 released her debut solo album  Letter.  In 1994 he participated in the festival  Yalta-Moscow-transit  (second prize), the contest station Europa Plus (Audience Award), Slavianski Bazaar in Vitebsk, and the contest of young performers  Under the roofs of St. Petersburg, where once won Alla Pugacheva.
In 1996 she graduated from St. Petersburg University of Humanities as actor and director of drama theater. 
She has been hosting a series of TV programs (Music Exam  and  Sharman Show, Russia-1).

Personal life 
She was married to photographer and cameraman Sergey Kulishenko two children —  Ivan (2004) and Alexander (2008). In May 2014 she married actor Yury Belyayev.

Selected filmography 
 1999 Angelica as Leni
 2001 Rostov-Daddy (TV series) as Syuzanna
 2003 Always say  Always (TV series) as Nadia Kudryashova
 2003 Ivanov and Rabinovich (TV series) as Klavka Ivanova
 2004 Knights of the Sea Stars (TV series) as Svetlana Bichutskaya
 2005 The Insider (TV series) as Varya
 2006 Stalin's Wife (Mini-series) as  Anna Alliluyeva
 2006 Ivan Podushkin. Gentleman Detective as Lucy
 2006 Cool Games (TV) as Zhanna
 2006 Russian Translation as secretary Marina Ryzhova
 2007 Ivan Podushkin. Gentleman Detective (Mini-series) as Lucy
 2010 Kiss Through a Wall as Roza Georginovna, editor 
 2014 Craftsmen (TV series) as Elena Klyuyeva
 2015 The Alchemist (TV series) as Valentina
 2022 Chainsaw Man (TV series) as Power

References

External links
 

1975 births
Living people
Russian television actresses
Russian film actresses
20th-century Russian actresses
21st-century Russian actresses
Russian television presenters
People from Tyumen
21st-century Russian singers
21st-century Russian women singers
Russian women television presenters